Menzhinskiy (also transliterated Menzhinsky) was the lead ship of Project 11351 Nerey-class frigate (NATO reporting name Krivak III) of the Soviet Border Troops and later the Coast Guard of the Federal Security Service of Russia.

Design and description
Menzhinskiy was one of nine Project 11351 ships launched between 1982 and 1992. Project 11351, the Nerey ("Nereus") class, was the patrol version of the Project 1135 Burevestnik for the Soviet Maritime Border Troops. The ships were designated Border Guard Ship (PSKR) to reflect their role as patrol ships of the Border Troops. In comparison to other members of the class, Project 11351 ships has a helipad and hangar for a Kamov Ka-27PS search-and-rescue helicopter astern, in exchange to losing one 100 mm gun, one twin-arm surface-to-air missile launcher and the URPK-5 Rastrub (SS-N-14 'Silex') anti-ship missile launchers. NATO classified the vessels as 'Krivak III'-class frigates.

Displacing  standard and  full load, the ship's power were provided by two  DT59 and two  DS71 gas turbines arranged in a COGAG installation, driving two fixed-pitch propellers. The ship's complement was 192, including 31 officers.

Armament and sensors
Menzhinskiy was armed with one  AK-100 gun mounted forward of the bridge and two AK-630M close-in weapon system autocannons mounted on each side of the helicopter hangar. Defence against aircraft was provided by twenty 4K33 OSA-M (SA-N-4 'Gecko') surface-to-air missiles which were launched from one set of twin-arm ZIF-122 launchers, mounted aft of the fore 100 mm gun. For anti-submarine warfare, the ship were equipped with a pair of RBU-6000  Smerch-2 12-barrel anti-submarine rocket launchers and a pair of PTA-53-1135 quadruple launchers for  torpedoes, consisted of either 53-65K wake homing torpedo or SET-65 anti-submarine homing torpedo. The ship can also carry 16 naval mines.

The ship sensor suites includes Sapfir-U7 combat management system, one Vaigach-Nayada navigation radar, and the MP-401 Start Electronic Support Measures (ESM) system. As with other Project 11351 ships, Menzhinskiy was supposed to be equipped with the more advanced MR-760 Fregat-MA air/surface radar, but due to delays the ship's radar was substituted with MR-310A Angara-A instead. Fire control for the guns consisted of MR-184 Lev radar for the 100 mm gun and Vympel-A radar for the 30 mm autocannons. An extensive sonar complex was fitted, including the bow-mounted MGK-335S Platina-S and the towed-array MG-345 Bronza. The vessel was also equipped with two PK-16 and two PK-10 decoy-dispenser system, which used chaff as a form of missile defense.

Construction and career
The frigate was the first ship of the class. The keel was laid on 14 August 1981 with yard number 201 at the Zaliv Shipyard in Kerch. The ship was launched on 31 December 1982. Menzhinskiy was commissioned to KGB Border Troops Naval Service on 29 December 1983.

The ship was assigned to the 16th Sakhalinskaya Red Banner Separate Brigade of Border Guard Ships in Nakhodka, part of the Pacific Border District. From 6 September to 22 October 1984, Menzhinskiy sailed from Sevastopol to its assigned homeport in Nakhodka via Suez Canal.

Menzhinskiy was decommissioned in 1998 and was stricken from the coast guard in 2000. According to Jane's Fighting Ships 2015-2016, the ship was extant and non-operational as of 2015.

References

Citations

Bibliography

External links

Project 11351 border guard ship "Menzhinsky" Gallery

1982 ships
Cold War frigates of the Soviet Union
Krivak-class frigates
Krivak-class frigates of the Border Guard Service of Russia
Ships built at the Zalyv Shipbuilding yard
Ships built in the Soviet Union